Stuart Saves His Family is a 1995 American comedy film directed by Harold Ramis based on a series of Saturday Night Live sketches from the early to mid-1990s. The film follows the adventures of would-be self-help guru Stuart Smalley, a creation of comedian Al Franken, as he attempts to save both his deeply troubled family and his low-rated public-access television show. Some of the plot is inspired by Franken's book, I'm Good Enough, I'm Smart Enough, and Doggone It, People Like Me!: Daily Affirmations by Stuart Smalley.

The film was produced by Lorne Michaels. Co-stars include Laura San Giacomo, Vincent D'Onofrio, Shirley Knight, Lesley Boone and Harris Yulin. Julia Sweeney, Joe Flaherty, Robin Duke, Richard Riehle, future WWE ring announcer Justin Roberts and Kurt Fuller have cameo roles.

Plot
Stuart Smalley (Al Franken), the disciple of the 12-step program, is challenged by life's injustices. He loses his public-access cable television show, must beg his manipulative overbearing boss for his job back, rehabilitate his alcoholic father and drug abusing brother (Vincent D'Onofrio), and support his overweight mother (Shirley Knight) and sister (Lesley Boone) in their lack of ability in handling their relationships with their husbands. Stuart is supported by his 12-step sponsors as he regresses to his negative behaviors each time he faces these challenges.

Cast
 Al Franken as Stuart Smalley
 Laura San Giacomo as Julia
 Vincent D'Onofrio as Donnie Smalley
 Shirley Knight as Mrs. Smalley
 Lesley Boone as Jodie Smalley
 Harris Yulin as Dad
 Julia Sweeney as Mea C.
 Joe Flaherty as Cousin Ray

Production
Al Franken created and played the character Stuart Smalley in Saturday Night Live sketches; in 1992 Franken wrote a book, in character as Stuart, titled I'm Good Enough, I'm Smart Enough, and Doggone It, People Like Me!: Daily Affirmations by Stuart Smalley. After reading the book, Harold Ramis approached Franken about developing it into a movie. According to Franken, Ramis was largely responsible for making the movie happen.

Reception
The film was a failure at the box office, earning only $912,082. This followed the box-office failures of other SNL-adaptations. Shortly after the movie left the theaters, Saturday Night Live featured a "Daily Affirmations with Stuart Smalley" sketch that parodied the poor box office returns. Stuart was depressed and bitter throughout the entire segment and lambasted the audience for choosing other movies (such as Dumb and Dumber and Bad Boys) over his.

In a 1999 appearance on The Howard Stern Show, Franken stated that he was "very proud" of the movie. However, in his 2003 book 'Oh, the Things I Know! A Guide to Success, or Failing That, Happiness, Franken mentioned his depression following the film's failure.

Critical response
On Rotten Tomatoes the film has an approval rating of 30% based on reviews from 27 critics, with an average rating of 4.7/10 . On Metacritic it has a weighted average score of 54% based on reviews from 16 critics. It received a nomination for Most Painfully Unfunny Comedy at the 1995 Stinkers Bad Movie Awards, which it lost to Ace Ventura: When Nature Calls.

Siskel & Ebert each gave the film a "thumbs up" rating, with Siskel calling it "smart and hip" and Ebert saying that "it has more courage than a lot of serious films."

Home media
Stuart Saves His Family was released on VHS in October 1995; it was released on DVD on April 17, 2001. In 2007, the film was packaged with two other Lorne Michaels productions, Wayne's World and Coneheads, to be sold as a "triple feature". In 2013, Warner Bros. acquired the management of Paramount's DVD library, and added Stuart Saves His Family to their Warner Archive Collection.

References

External links
 
 
 Review of the movie by Roger Ebert

1995 films
1995 comedy films
American comedy films
Saturday Night Live films
Saturday Night Live in the 1990s
Films set in Minnesota
Films set in Chicago
Films directed by Harold Ramis
Paramount Pictures films
Films with screenplays by Al Franken
Films scored by Marc Shaiman
Films produced by Lorne Michaels
1990s English-language films
1990s American films